Neha Saxena is an Indian actress who appears in Malayalam, Tulu, Tamil Telugu, Kannada and Hindi films. She is best known for her roles in the Malayalam films such as Munthirivallikal Thalirkkumbol and
Aaraattu alongside Mohanlal and Kasaba with Mammootty.

She shared screen space with Saif Ali Khan in Chef (2017). She played the role of Mandakini in the Kannada soap opera HaraHara Mahadeva. She has also acted in a few Tamil, Telugu, Tulu, Sanskrit, and Bollywood films.

Films

Television shows

References

External links
 
 

Year of birth missing (living people)
Indian film actresses
Living people
Actresses in Malayalam cinema
Actresses in Tamil cinema
Actresses in Kannada cinema
Actresses in Telugu cinema
Actresses from Dehradun
21st-century Indian actresses